Madman and Vagabond (Spanish:Loco y vagabundo) is a 1946 Mexican comedy film directed by Carlos Orellana and starring Manuel Medel, Meche Barba and Manuel Arvide.

The film's sets were designed by Carlos Toussaint.

Cast
 Manuel Medel as Fortunato  
 Meche Barba as Virginia  
 Manuel Arvide as Licenciado 
 José Jasso as Cacahuate  
 Beatriz Jimeno as Sara  
 Chel López as Almirante Nelson  
 Velia Martinez

References

Bibliography 
 Rogelio Agrasánchez. Cine Mexicano: Posters from the Golden Age, 1936-1956. Chronicle Books, 2001.

External links 
 

1946 films
1946 comedy films
Mexican comedy films
1940s Spanish-language films
Films directed by Carlos Orellana
Mexican black-and-white films
1940s Mexican films